Suppo I (or Suppone) (died 5 March 824) was a Frankish nobleman who held lands in the Regnum Italicum in the early ninth century.

In 817, he was made Count of Brescia, Parma, Piacenza, Modena, and Bergamo. He was also made a missus dominicus, along with the Brescian bishop Ratald, for Italy. In 818, he was instrumental in putting down the rebellion of Bernard against the Emperor, Louis the Pious. In 822, after the abdication and death of Duke Winiges, Suppo was created Duke of Spoleto by the grateful emperor and he passed Brescia to his son Mauring. Suppo's death was recorded by Einhard and Spoleto went to Adelard, who died within five months, leaving the duchy to Mauring, Duke of Spoleto.

Suppo probably had a Lombard wife, for his second son was named Adelchis.

References

Wickham, Chris. Early Medieval Italy: Central Power and Local Society 400-1000. MacMillan Press: 1981.

9th-century dukes of Spoleto
Supponid dynasty
8th-century births
824 deaths

Year of birth unknown